Sauk language can refer to either:

Sauk or Ma Manda language of Papua New Guinea
Sauk language of the Sac tribe of Native Americans (a dialect of Fox, also called Meskwaki)

See also 
 Saek language, a Tai language of Laos
 Sok language, an Austroasiatic language of Laos